Juan Pablo Urrego (born January 4, 1986 in Medellín, Antioquia, Colombia), is a Colombian television actor. He trained as an actor in Havana, Cuba and Buenos Aires, Argentina. He is currently best known for his characters in the series Hermanitas Calle, Sin senos sí hay paraíso and Surviving Escobar.

Filmography

References

External links 

1986 births
21st-century Colombian male actors
Colombian male telenovela actors
People from Medellín
Living people